Chengguan Township is a township in Shangshui County, eastern Henan province, Central China, bordering the urban area of Zhoukou City. As of 2009, it had a population of around 35000 living in 18 villages, covering  of land.

References

Township-level divisions of Henan
Shangshui County